LQG may refer to:

 Loop quantum gravity, a theory that aims to merge quantum mechanics and general relativity
 Liouville quantum gravity, a theory of gravity on two-dimensional surfaces
 Linear–quadratic–Gaussian control, an optimal control problem
 Large quasar group, a massive collection of black holes and the largest known object in the universe